The Machzike Hadath community synagogue is a Lithuanian synagogue founded in 1891.

The synagogue, also known as the Spitalfields Great Synagogue, was founded in 1891 in the East End of London, England.  In 1893, it merged with the Machzike Shomrei Shabbat Synagogue of Booth Street.  In 1898 they acquired premises in Spitalfields, at the corner of Fournier Street and Brick Lane, where they remained for 70 years.  The building, first established in 1743 as a Protestant chapel ("La Neuve Eglise") by London's French Huguenot community and later a Methodist Chapel, is now the Brick Lane Mosque. The synagogue moved to Golders Green in 1970 where its new building was consecrated in 1983.

The first rabbi of the community was Rabbi Avraham Aba Werner (1891–1912).  Later rabbis include Rabbi Avraham Yitzchak HaKohen Kook, and Rabbi Yechezkel Abramsky. The current rabbi is Rabbi Ilan Halberstadt who was appointed in May 2018.

In the late 1920s the Machzike Hadath sponsored the publication of an edition of the Mishna Berura.

See also
 Machzikei Hadas#Machzikei Hadas - Name

References

External links
  - The official synagogue website
 Machzike Hadath Synagogue on Jewish Communities and Records - UK (hosted by jewishgen.org).

Synagogues in London
Religious organizations established in 1891
1891 establishments in the Russian Empire
Synagogues completed in 1983